"Light in Your Eyes" is a song by the American rock band, Blessid Union of Souls. It was the third track on, and the second single from, their second studio album, Blessid Union of Souls.

Track listing
CD:

Cassette:

Chart positions

References

External links
 

1997 songs
1998 singles
Blessid Union of Souls songs